Gregory O'Neil McCarthy (born October 30, 1968) is an American former professional baseball relief pitcher.

Career
In , McCarthy pitched for the independent Macon Peaches of the Southeastern League. In , he pitched for the independent Atlantic City Surf of the Atlantic League and independent New Haven County Cutters of the Northeast League.

Since his playing career ended, McCarthy has coached in the Netherlands and in baseball clinics and academies. On February 17, he was hired to be the head coach of the Mosquito Athletics Attnang-Puchheim in the Austrian Baseball League.

Early life 
Greg McCarthy graduated from Central High School in Bridgeport, Connecticut

References

External links

1968 births
Living people
African-American baseball coaches
African-American baseball players
American expatriate baseball players in Canada
American expatriate sportspeople in the Czech Republic
Atlantic City Surf players
Baseball coaches from Connecticut
Baseball players from Connecticut
Birmingham Barons players
Bridgeport Bluefish players
Calgary Cannons players
Canton-Akron Indians players
Charlotte Knights players
Clearwater Phillies players
Columbus Clippers players
Expatriate baseball players in the Czech Republic
American expatriate baseball players in the Netherlands
Kinston Indians players
Konica Minolta Pioniers players
Macon Peaches players
Major League Baseball pitchers
New Haven County Cutters players
Seattle Mariners players
Spartanburg Phillies players
Sportspeople from Norwalk, Connecticut
Tacoma Rainiers players
Utica Blue Sox players
Central High School (Connecticut) alumni
21st-century African-American people
20th-century African-American sportspeople
American expatriate sportspeople in Austria